Golden Valley is an unincorporated area and census-designated place (CDP) in Mohave County, Arizona, United States. The population was 8,801 at the 2020 census.

History
Golden Valley was named after a company from Hollywood, California, that went into partnership with Crystal Collins to develop most of the land south of Arizona State Route 68 into  parcels. The company's name was Golden Valley Development Company. The land was split into 2.5 acre parcels and sold for $695 each: $10 down and $10 per month.

Geography
The community of Golden Valley lies in the Sacramento Valley, separated from the larger neighboring cities of Kingman and Bullhead City by the surrounding mountain ranges. State Route 68 runs through the heart of Golden Valley, leading east  to Kingman and west over the Black Mountains  to Bullhead City. At the eastern end of Golden Valley, Arizona 68 terminates at U.S. Route 93, which leads to Kingman to the south, or Las Vegas, Nevada, to the north. The center of the community is at  (35.223016, -114.214988).

According to the United States Census Bureau, the Golden Valley CDP has a total area , all of it land.

Residents work in Golden Valley, Kingman, Bullhead, Laughlin, Lake Havasu and even as far as Las Vegas.

Demographics

As of the census of 2000, there were 4,515 people, 1,822 households, and 1,288 families residing in the CDP. The racial makeup of the CDP was 94.0% White, 0.5% Black or African American, 1.0% Native American, 0.7% Asian, 0.2% Pacific Islander, 1.8% from other races, and 1.8% from two or more races.  8.0% of the population were Hispanic or Latino of any race.

There were 1,822 households, out of which 23.3% had children under the age of 18 living with them, 57.1% were married couples living together, 9.1% had a female householder with no husband present, and 29.3% were non-families. 22.6% of all households were made up of individuals, and 9.1% had someone living alone who was 65 years of age or older.  The average household size was 2.48 and the average family size was 2.87.

In the CDP, the population was spread out, with 22.4% under the age of 18, 4.7% from 18 to 24, 21.7% from 25 to 44, 33.1% from 45 to 64, and 18.1% who were 65 years of age or older.  The median age was 46 years. For every 100 females, there were 105.3 males.  For every 100 females age 18 and over, there were 101.7 males.

The median income for a household in the CDP was $27,857, and the median income for a family was $30,662. Males had a median income of $26,319 versus $19,556 for females. The per capita income for the CDP was $13,948.  About 10.6% of families and 15.3% of the population were below the poverty line, including 22.3% of those under age 18 and 11.7% of those age 65 or over.

Infrastructure
Golden Valley is an unincorporated area and is administered directly by Mohave County. Police protection is provided by the Mohave County Sheriff's Office; fire protection is provided by the Golden Valley Fire Department. K–12 education is provided by Kingman Unified School District. One elementary school, Black Mountain Elementary, is located in Golden Valley, but older students must be bused to Kingman for high school.

State prison
When it was being sold to the residents of Golden Valley it was promised it would be a prison for DUI offenders only. Due to control of the inmate population problems the contract for the prison has changed hands since its opening. It is a for-profit prison operated by GEO Group under contract to hold inmates for the Arizona Department of Corrections.

2010 escapes

On July 30, 2010, three inmates, two incarcerated for murders, one for attempted homicides, escaped from the facility.  One was recaptured in western Colorado on August 1, after a shootout with a Garfield County deputy and city police in Rifle, Colorado.  A second was recaptured by U.S. Marshals on August 9 in Meeteetse, Wyoming.  The third escapee and his accomplice cousin were captured near Springerville  on August 19, 2010, also by U.S. Marshals, in an east-central Arizona, White Mountains, U.S. Forest Service campground.

July 2015 riots
On July 1, 2 and 4, riots broke out once again at the Arizona State Prison – Kingman, at Golden Valley, which had "a long history of problems." Nine guards and seven inmates were injured, and the state brought in 96 members of its special tactical unit to quell the disturbances.

MTC contract termination
In August 2015, Arizona governor Doug Ducey terminated the contract with MTC after an Arizona Department of Corrections investigative report revealed the company had "a culture of disorganization, disengagement, and disregard" of DOC policies.

See also

 List of census-designated places in Arizona

References

External links

Census-designated places in Mohave County, Arizona